The Styx River is a river of the West Coast Region of New Zealand. It flows west for 16 km from Styx Saddle into the Kokatahi River, through native bush for the majority of its length.

References

Westland District
Rivers of the West Coast, New Zealand
Rivers of New Zealand